HMS London was a 96-gun first-rate ship of the line of the Royal Navy, built by Christopher Pett at Deptford Dockyard until his death in March 1668, and completed by Jonas Shish and launched in 1670.

She was rebuilt at Chatham Dockyard in 1706 as a 100-gun first rate. In 1721 London was enlarged slightly, giving her a tonnage of 1711 bm. She was broken up in 1747.

Notes

References

Lavery, Brian (2003) The Ship of the Line - Volume 1: The development of the battlefleet 1650-1850. Conway Maritime Press. .
Winfield, Rif (2009) British Warships in the Age of Sail 1603-1714: Design, Construction, Careers and Fates. Seaforth Publishing. .

External links
 

Ships of the line of the Royal Navy
1670s ships